Giffnock railway station is a railway station in the town of Giffnock, East Renfrewshire, Scotland. The station is managed by ScotRail and is on the East Kilbride branch of the Glasgow South Western Line.

History 
The station was opened by the Busby Railway on 1 January 1866.

Location 
The station is located in the town centre of Giffnock. The station has a large car park servicing it that it shares with Giffnock Library. The station is located on Station Road and has a footbridge crossing the line that also serves as access from Giffnock's eastern areas to the town centre, as it is the only access across the line in this area. The station has 2 platforms. The western platform is for trains to Glasgow Central and the eastern one for trains to East Kilbride. The next station towards Glasgow is Thornliebank and the next station toward East Kilbride is Clarkston.

Services 
Express trains also use the line, but they don't stop at Giffnock. The nearest station they stop at is Clarkston

References

Notes

Sources

External links
 RAILSCOT on Busby Railway

Railway stations in East Renfrewshire
SPT railway stations
Railway stations served by ScotRail
Railway stations in Great Britain opened in 1866
Former Caledonian Railway stations
1866 establishments in Scotland
Giffnock